Jonionių gyvenvietės is an archaeological site in Varėna district municipality, in Alytus County, in southeastern Lithuania.

References

Varėna District Municipality